Gandedhe is a 2010 Indian Kannada language romantic action film written and directed by Akula Shiva and produced by Ramu of Ramu Enterprises. The film stars Chiranjeevi Sarja and Ragini Dwivedi in the lead roles. Noted composer Chakri scored the music.

Plot
Krishna (Chiranjeevi) is a poor college going boy who falls in love with his classmate Nandini (Ragini). Nandini is the daughter of a rich landlord Shankare Gowda (Devaraj). Both fall in love and seeks approval from their parents. Nandini's father is much against the alliance and disapproves of the relationship. The rest of the story deals with the methods adopted by Krishna to win over Nandini's family with the help of his friend SMS (Raghu), who has a solution for every issue that Krishna faces.

Cast 
 Chiranjeevi Sarja as Krishna
 Ragini Dwivedi as Nandini
 Devaraj as Shankare Gowda
 Rangayana Raghu as SMS
 Sharath Lohitashwa 
 Ramesh Bhat
 Aruna Balaraj
 Kashi
Jim ravi 
Sathyajith 
Kempegowda 
Dombara Krishna Suresh 
Pavan Benaka 
Vaijanath Biradar 
Suryanarayana waali 
 Honnavalli Krishna

Production
Ramu, the head of Ramu Enterprises, teamed up with the Telugu film writer Akul Shiva to direct his debut Kannada film in late 2008. He roped in actor Chiranjeevi Sarja to play the lead role. Actress Ragini Dwivedi was also approached and signed into the team. The film was announced to be basically set in a college campus background. The unit shot two songs in and around Singapore for about eight days.

Soundtrack 

Music was Composed by Chakri and launched on Anand Audio Video.

Reception

Release 

The film released on 30 July 2010 across Karnataka.

Critical response 

Shruti Indira Lakshminarayana of Rediff.com scored the film at 1 out of 5 stars and says "Music is by Chakri. Songs fail to make an impact and the lyrics don't help in the least. Most songs come with a heard-it-before feel too. What's more is that they add to the length of the film. Overdramatic dialogues and scenes like the one in which an immersed Ganesha idol helps the hero, who has been thrown into a river by goons, to recover, spoil things further. All in all, a confusing potboiler". A critic from Sify.com wrote "Chakri's music is a big let down. Mujeeb's photography is nothing spectacular though the fight sequences are well choreographed. 'Gandedhe' is a predictable fare with just some good fight scenes thrown in".

References

External links 

 

2010 films
Indian romantic action films
2010s romantic action films
Films scored by Chakri
Films shot in Singapore
2010s Kannada-language films